Quyjuq-e Olya (also Romanized as Qūyjūq-e ‘Olyā and Qūy Jūq-e ‘Olyā) is a village in Qeshlaqat-e Afshar Rural District, Afshar District, Khodabandeh County, Zanjan Province, Iran. At the 2006 census, its population was 312, in 63 families.

References 

Populated places in Khodabandeh County